Soukeina Sagna (born 17 April 1998) is a French handballer who plays for Mérignac Handball.

Sagna competed at the 2016 Youth World Handball Championship as a member of the French national under-18 team, being the team's leading scorer.

References

External links
 

1998 births
Living people
Sportspeople from Saint-Denis, Seine-Saint-Denis
French female handball players